Shubhapantuvarali (pronounced , meaning the auspicious moon) is a rāgam in Carnatic music (musical scale of South Indian classical music). It is the 45th melakarta rāgam in the 72 melakarta rāgam system of Carnatic music. It is called  in Muthuswami Dikshitar school of Carnatic music. Todi (thaat) is the equivalent in Hindustani music. Being sad in tone, it is usually used for sad songs by musicians.

Structure and Lakshana

It is the 3rd rāgam in the 8th chakra Vasu. The mnemonic name is Vasu-Go. The mnemonic phrase is sa ra gi mi pa dha nu. Its  structure (ascending and descending scale) is as follows (see swaras in Carnatic music for details on below notation and terms):
: 
: 

This scale uses the notes shuddha rishabham, sadharana gandharam, prati madhyamam, shuddha dhaivatham and kakali nishadham. As it is a melakarta rāgam, by definition it is a sampoorna rāgam (has all seven notes in ascending and descending scale). It is the prati madhyamam equivalent of Dhenuka, which is the 9th melakarta scale.

Janya rāgams 
Shubhapantuvarali has a few minor janya rāgams (derived scales) associated with it. See List of janya rāgams for full list of rāgams associated with Shubhapantuvarali.

Compositions
Here are a few common compositions sung in concerts, set to Shubhapantuvarali.

Ennalu urake by Thyagaraja
Sri Satyanarayanam and Pasupatheeswaram by Muthuswami Dikshitar
Pahimaam payoraasi varnam composed by Kalyani Varadarajan
Nee Samanamevaru composed by G.N. Balasubramaniam
Karunanu Nanu kĀpĀdumu composed by Dr. M. Balamuralikrishna
Sri Lakshmi Ramana Narayana composed by Narayana Raju
Velane Vere Gati composed by Koteeswara Iyer
’'Paripahimam Shri Dasarathe'’ composed by Mysore Vasudevachariar

Film Songs

Language: Tamil & Malayalam

Related rāgams
This section covers the theoretical and scientific aspect of this rāgam.

Shubhapantuvarali's notes when shifted using Graha bhedam, yields a melakarta rāgam, namely, Chalanata. Graha bhedam is the step taken in keeping the relative note frequencies same, while shifting the shadjam to the next note in the rāgam. For further details and an illustration refer Graha bhedam on Chalanata.

Notes

References

Melakarta ragas